Hasan Namir (born 1987) is an Iraqi-Canadian writer, whose debut novel God in Pink won the Lambda Literary Award for Gay Fiction at the 28th Lambda Literary Awards.

Born in Iraq in 1987, Namir moved to Canada with his family at age 11. He is a graduate of Simon Fraser University, and lives in Vancouver, British Columbia. God in Pink, a novel about a gay man living in Baghdad during the Iraq War, was published by Arsenal Pulp Press in 2015. In 2019 he was named one of "19 Canadian writers to watch in 2019" by the CBC.

His poetry book War / Torn was released on April 10, 2019, and was shortlisted for a Stonewall Book Award in 2020.

References

1987 births
21st-century Canadian novelists
21st-century Canadian poets
Canadian male novelists
Canadian male poets
Canadian LGBT novelists
Canadian LGBT poets
Canadian gay writers
Iraqi emigrants to Canada
Simon Fraser University alumni
Writers from Vancouver
Lambda Literary Award for Gay Fiction winners
Living people
Canadian Muslims
LGBT Muslims
21st-century Canadian male writers
Gay poets
Gay novelists
21st-century Canadian LGBT people